Septimus Coppinger (15 September 1828 – 8 April 1870) was a first-class cricketer.  Born at Tenterden, Kent he played nine first-class matches for Sussex as a right-handed batsman between 1857 and 1862.  He died at Epsom, Surrey.

External links

1828 births
English cricketers
Sussex cricketers
1870 deaths
New All England Eleven cricketers